Sheldon Hall is a historic collegiate building located on the campus of the State University of New York at Oswego at Oswego in Oswego County, New York.

It was built in 1911 and is a Neoclassical style structure that consists of a two-story main block built of brick and terra cotta above a raised basement with flanking wings.  It features a copper clad clock tower and belfry above a pediment on the main block.

It was listed on the National Register of Historic Places in 1980.

References

School buildings on the National Register of Historic Places in New York (state)
Neoclassical architecture in New York (state)
School buildings completed in 1911
State University of New York at Oswego
Buildings and structures in Oswego County, New York
National Register of Historic Places in Oswego County, New York
1911 establishments in New York (state)